The Gambela Region (also spelled Gambella), officially the Gambela Peoples' Region, is a regional state in western Ethiopia, bordering South Sudan. Previously known as Region 12, its capital is Gambela. The Region is situated between the Baro and Akobo Rivers, with its western part including the Baro River.

Demographics 
Based on the 2007 Census conducted by the Central Statistical Agency of Ethiopia (CSA), the Gambela region has total population of 307,096, consisting of 159,787 men and 147,309 women; urban inhabitants number 77,925 or 25.37% of the population. With an estimated area of 29,782.82 square kilometers, this region has an estimated density of 10 people per square kilometer. For the entire region, 66,467 households were counted, which results in an average for the region of 4.6 persons to a household, with urban households having on average 3.8 and rural households 4.9 people. The Gambela region is mainly inhabited by various Nilotic ethnic majority populations: Nuer 64.66%, Anuak (Anywak) 29.6%, Majang 5%.

In 1994, the national census reported the region's population to be 181,862 in 35,940 households, of whom 92,902 were men and 88,960 women; 27,424 or 15.08% of the population were urban inhabitants. (This total also includes an estimate for all 19 kebeles of one woreda and 6 kebeles in two other woredas, which were not counted; these areas were estimated to have 19,465 inhabitants, of whom 9,203 were men and 10,262 women.) The six largest ethnic groups of the region were Nuer (67.7%), Anuak (Anywak)  (20.45%), Amhara (7.74%), Oromo (6.49%, Majang (5.76%), and Komo (4.18%); all other ethnic groups made up 8.68% of the population. Nuer is spoken as a first language by 90.72%, Amharic 2.47% speak .Afaan room 8.44% Majang, 6.45% Ofaan oromo  , and 5.75% speak Nuer; the remaining 12.17% spoke all other primary languages reported. The projected population for 2017 was 435,999.

Values for reported common indicators of the standard of living for Gambela  include the following: 44% of the inhabitants fall into the lowest wealth quintile; adult literacy for men is 57.5% and for women 22.8%; and the regional infant mortality rate is 92 infant deaths per 1,000 live births, which is greater than the nationwide average of 77; at least half of these deaths occurred in the infants’ first month of life.

Religion

70.1% of the region's population are Protestants , 16.8% Orthodox , 4.9% Muslim, 3.8% practice traditional religions, 3.4% Catholic.

Refugee camps
There are a number of refugee camps located in Gambela region housing around 268,000 refugees from South Sudan in August 2016:

From August 2016 to August 2018, the numbers increased from 268,000 to 402,000 refugees, almost equaling the native population of Gambela Region.

Economy 
The CSA reported that for 2004-2005 3,734 tons of coffee were produced in Gambela, based on inspection records from the Ethiopian Coffee and Tea authority. This represents 1.64% of the total production in Ethiopia.  The CSA could not provide livestock estimates for Gambela. In a 26 May 2000 report, the FAO observed that at the time Trypanosomiasis was a major problem in cattle for this region. There was an epidemic of this disease in the area during 1970.

Gambela is believed to have major oil resources. In June 2003, the Ethiopian government signed an agreement with Petronas of Malaysia for the joint exploration and development of oil resources in Gambella region. Petronas then awarded a contract for seismic data acquisition to China’s Zhongyuan Petroleum Exploration Bureau (ZPEB) October of that year.

The Water and Mines Resources Development Bureau of Gambela announced January 2007 that it was initiating a program that would drill 13 new manually operated wells, 54 new deep water wells, and develop four springs. This would provide access to drinking water for 26,000 inhabitants, increasing coverage for the state to 42 percent from the existing 27 percent, at a cost of 6 million Birr. Construction of an asphalt road 102 kilometers in length and connecting Gambela City with Jikawo by way of Itang was begun in 2008 with a budget over 446 million Birr.

As of 2015, Indian investors have acquired 6,000 square km of land in the Gambela region, following other investors, for agricultural land from the central government. This has led to conflict with regional government officials and local communities. Not all the land is actually being farmed, as per the agreement, and there are accusations of investors illegally clearing trees in the Gambella National Park in a blog.

Administrative subdivisions 

While Gambela is subdivided into administrative zones and woredas as other regions in Ethiopia are, this region has seen the most changes in these subdivisions of any region, to the point they can confuse anyone tracing their development. Originally, Gambela was subdivided into four administrative zones without proper names (1, 2, 3 and 4) and one special woreda (Godere special woreda). By 2001, when the CSA released its Sample Agricultural Enumeration, these four zones had been combined into two, and Godere had been merged into the second administrative zone.

By the 2007 census, Gambela had been redivided into three zones (named for the three largest ethnic groups), and the area around Itang town had been made a special woreda; borders of existing woredas were moved around to create several new ones within the zones. These zones are:

 Anywaa Zone
 Majang Zone
 Nuer Zone
 Itang (woreda)
 Nuer Zone is by far the largest of the zones of Gambela region and also includes the capital, Gambela. The terrain is mostly flat at elevations between 400 – 550 meters above sea level but with the eastern fringes of Anywaa Zone and in particular the easternmost zone, Majang, being partly in the highlands and going up to an elevation of ~2000 meters near the eastern border.

Governors and chairmen of the ruling party 
Governor and chairman of the ruling party in Gambela region 1991–2018:
Agwa Alemu (GPLM) 1991 – 1992
Okello Ouman (GPLM) 1992 – 1997
Okello Gnigelo (GPDF) August 1997 – 2003
Okello Akway 2003 – 2004
Keat Tuach Bithow (acting) January 2004 – 2005
Omod Obong (GPDM) 29 September 2005 – April 2013
Gatluak Tut Khot (GPDM) April 2013 – October 2018
Omud Ojulu Obub (Prosperity Party ) October 2018 – present
(This list is based on information from Worldstatesmen.org.)

References

External links 
FDRE States: Basic Information - Gambella
"Violence in Gambella: An Overview" on the site of Oxfam America.
"The Current Situation in Gambella", Press Release from the Federal Democratic Republic of Ethiopia, Ministry of Federal Affairs 
Map of Gambela region at UN-OCHA
Map of the Gambela region at the Disaster Prevention and Preparedness Agency (DPPA) of Ethiopia

Further reading 
 Fred Pierce, 'The Land Grabbers'
 Medhane Tadesse, "Gambella: The impact of local conflict on regional security" Institute for Security Studies website
 Human Rights Watch, "Targeting the Anuak: Human Rights Violations and Crimes Against Humanity in Ethiopia's Gambella Region"

 
Regions of Ethiopia
States and territories established in 1992